Charlottetown Thermal Generating Station is a natural diesel oil power station owned by  Maritime Electric, in Charlottetown, Prince Edward Island.  The plant is primarily used during periods of peak demand or when the power supply from the mainline is impaired.

The plant was the main source of electricity for the island until the first cable to the mainland was finished in 1977. The station is currently being decommissioned, and as a result its two smokestacks will be torn down. Now that two new cables have been finished in 2017, there isn't even a need for the plant as a backup.

Description
The plant consists of:
 Five oil fired generating units (Pre-1969)
 One diesel fired LM6000 combustion turbine supplied by General Electric installed in 2005 at a cost of $35 Million.

References

Buildings and structures in Charlottetown
Oil-fired power stations in Prince Edward Island